Macquarie Graduate School of Management (MGSM) is a graduate school of management established in 1969, associated with Macquarie University, Australia.

MGSM has campuses in North Ryde (located on Macquarie University campus), Sydney's CBD and Hong Kong. At both the Macquarie University campus and the city campus MGSM has meeting and conferencing facilities, 4-star accommodation, dining and catering options and recreational facilities. In 2005, the conferences centre won the NSW Meetings & Events Australia award for Best Meeting Venue Under 500 Delegates.

The school's mission is to develop leaders with a global mindset who create sustainable value and are good citizens.

History 

MGSM began life as the Centre for Management Studies (CMS) within the school of Economic and Financial Studies at North Ryde, Sydney, Australia in 1969. CMS began offering a Graduate Diploma in Business Administration in 1970 and in 1972 it offered a three year, part-time Master of Business Administration (MBA). In early 1980, CMS developed its own identity as the Graduate School of Management (GMS); it remained within the School of Economic and Financial Studies.

In the mid1980s, the GSM Advisory board recommended GSM should have a separate identity and its own separate dedicated teaching facility. Funds were raised to build the campus from the late 1980s and during the 1990s.

GSM moved to a 40-week teaching term, four-term year in 1989–1990 and this enabled the development of a 16-unit MBA which could be completed in two years' part-time. Master of Arts programmes were developed and later replaced by Master of Management programmes. GSM went offshore and began delivering programmes in Singapore in 1992 and in Hong Kong in 1994.

Until 1998, MGSM consisted of two institutions, the GSM and MGSM. At this time the board decided to integrate the school and the new entity became known as MGSM.
The Sydney CBD campus was opened in 2000.

In early 2009, the Deputy Vice Chancellor Macquarie University undertook a major review process of MGSM which decided that the school should retain its autonomy. It is now the only business school in Australia to remain autonomous from a university.

MGSM launched its Online Interactive Study option in Term one of 2013.

Programs 
MGSM's key program is its MBA. The MBA differs to many business schools, in that the same MBA is delivered to both full-time and executive students.  The MBA consists of 16 units of study, 10 of which are compulsory, core subjects, and the remaining six are electives.

Other coursework programs draw from the subjects offered through the MBA, such as the Master of Management, and a postgraduate diploma. The Master of Management is designed for students who have recently graduated from an undergraduate degree from any disciplinary background and who are looking to build up their skills and experience for a career in business management or management consultancy.

The school also delivers short-term Executive Education Programs and customised degree or non-degree programs for organisations in the areas of leadership, management, interpersonal skills innovation and neuroscience.

Research 
MGSM has six key focus areas for its research: leadership, strategy and organisational change; finance management research; marketing; reflective practice in management education; supply chain management; and sustainable leadership and organisations. MGSM accepts candidates to its PhD and MPhil programs, and there is emphasis on post-doctoral research by faculty.

Reputation and profile
MGSM's MBA and management programs are accredited by AACSB International—The Association to Advance Collegiate Schools of Business. 687 schools of business, or less than 5% worldwide, have this accreditation.

Rankings of MGSM include:

Alumni 
There are more than 16,500 members of the MGSM Alumni Community, situated in over 135 countries around the world. Notable alumni include Andrew Scipione, NSW Police Commissioner.

References

Business schools in Australia
Macquarie University
Educational institutions established in 1969